CSH (or its styling variants Csh or csh) is a three-letter acronym with multiple meanings:

Locations
 Cecil Sharp House, home of the English Folk Dance and Song Society
 Chartwell Seniors Housing, a real estate investment trust in Canada
 Cold Spring Harbor Laboratory, a genetics laboratory in Cold Spring Harbor
 Cold Spring Harbor, New York, a town on Long Island
 See also Cold Spring Harbor (disambiguation)

Medicine, science and technology
 Caesium hydride, a crystalline solid with the molecular formula CsH
 C-S-H, calcium silicate hydrate, or calcium silicate hydrogel, the main component of hardened cement paste: the glue phase in hardened Portland cement
 C shell, a Unix shell
 Combat Support Hospital, a type of military field hospital
 Context-sensitive help, method of providing online help
 CSH Protocols, an on-line scientific journal for biologists
 Photoshop Custom Shape Object, a file format for use with Adobe Systems' Photoshop

Transport
 Carshalton railway station, London, National Rail station code CSH
 Cycle Superhighways, a bicycle route scheme in London
 Shanghai Airlines, ICAO airline designator CSH

Other
 Canadian Subject Headings is a list of subject headings of Canadian topics
 Case Study Houses, experiments in American residential architecture from 1945 until 1966
 Cash America International has the NYSE designator CSH
 Coalition to Save Harlem
 Code for Sustainable Homes
 Convent of the Sacred Heart (disambiguation)
 Coordination Syndicale Haïtienne (CSH), a Haitian trade union
 Council for Secular Humanism
 Sun Hei SC, a football club in Hong Kong 
 Car Seat Headrest, an American band